is a Japanese football player for Roasso Kumamoto on loan from Cerezo Osaka.

Club statistics
Updated to 23 February 2018.

References

External links

Profile at Roasso Kumamoto

1991 births
Living people
Kansai University alumni
Association football people from Osaka Prefecture
People from Ōsakasayama, Osaka
Japanese footballers
J1 League players
J2 League players
J3 League players
Cerezo Osaka players
Cerezo Osaka U-23 players
SC Sagamihara players
Roasso Kumamoto players
Association football defenders